Beacon Hill High School (abbreviation: BHHS) also known for a time as Beacon Hill Technology High School is a former high school in the northern Sydney suburb of Beacon Hill, New South Wales, Australia. It was a co-educational high school operated by the New South Wales Department of Education and Training with students from years 7 to 12. The school was established in January 1964. However, due to declining enrolments the school was closed in December 2002, coinciding with the establishment of the Northern Beaches Secondary College. The last years were merged into Freshwater Senior Campus.

Closure
In June 2000, the Department of Education and Training announced that the school would close because of falling enrolments. Following the announcement, local residents formed a committee to prevent the closure, and later to prevent a Government sale of the school site and make the site available for the community, known as the Retain Beacon Hill High School Committee.

The closure of the school was criticised by the Greens New South Wales Education spokesman, John Kaye, who said in a media release: "The demolition of Beacon Hill High School is a monument to poor planning, developer-driven government decisions and a deceitful and inadequate closure process. The closure and demolition of the school is a textbook case of short term thinking. This will leave the local community struggling for public education options  within the next seven years."

The school site was sold by the state government in 2007 for a price in the vicinity of $8,750,000. The site was granted development approval by the Minister for Planning, and the school buildings were demolished in January 2007 to make way for a 26 allotment residential subdivision.

Notable past students
Bill Leak, editorial cartoonist for The Australian
Callan Mulvey, actor
 Greg McCallum Rugby League Referee
 Brendon McQueen – Co Founder of Hotels Combined
 Matt Noyen – NRL Referee
 Chris Glassock – ABC radio sports reporter
 Merrick Davis, Professional Surfer
 Leanne West, Journalist
 Brady Halls, Journalist
 Rebecca Harris, Television Presenter
 Ivan Cleary, Rugby League player and coach
Alexandra Tesoriero (née Brunning), Actress and business woman
 Jon Pollard actor and author

References

External links
BHHS Alumni Facebook
BHHS former students Facebook page
BHHS School Badge
BHHS Honour Board
Google Earth view BHHS Feb 2006
BHHS Former Students Website & Yearbooks

Defunct schools in Sydney
Defunct public high schools in Sydney
Educational institutions established in 1964
Educational institutions disestablished in 2002
1964 establishments in Australia
2002 disestablishments in Australia
Northern Beaches
Demolished buildings and structures in New South Wales
Buildings and structures demolished in 2007